Stevenstown is a small unincorporated community in La Crosse County, Wisconsin, United States, in the town of Farmington. It is part of the La Crosse, Wisconsin Metropolitan Statistical Area.

Landmarks

Stevenstown is notable for Agger Rockshelter, a rock shelter that was home to an ancient people, and is a farming community.

Notes

Unincorporated communities in Wisconsin
Unincorporated communities in La Crosse County, Wisconsin